Parliamentary elections were held in the Grand Duchy of Finland on 1 and 2 October 1917. The general voter turnout was higher than in previous elections. The Social Democrats lost the absolute majority that they had had in the previous two elections (although they, like the other parties, had increased their number of votes in absolute terms). In other words, the "bourgeois" (non-socialist) parties taken together now had more than half the seats.

Background
The elections were the result of the constitutional crisis in Finland caused by the Russian revolution. As Russian Tsar Nicholas, head of state in Finland, had abdicated without a successor, the Finnish Parliament stated that it would become the highest power in internal matters. The Russian Provisional Government did not accept this, but ordered premature parliamentary elections, which was thought illegal by the Socialists.

Campaign
The Social Democrats demanded the quick implementation of eight-hour work day and the quick freeing of tenant farmers.  The bourgeois parties, on average, wanted first to ensure that Finland would become fully independent, and only then to implement such social and economic reforms.

Results

References

General elections in Finland
Finland
Parliament
Finland
Election and referendum articles with incomplete results